Breakwater is an American funk band from Philadelphia. The band released two albums: Breakwater in 1978, and Splashdown in 1980. The latter features the song "Release the Beast", which was sampled in the intro for rapper Murs' album Murs 3:16: The 9th Edition, as well as in "Robot Rock" by electronic duo Daft Punk which appeared on the album Human After All.

Background
The band, originally from Philadelphia was formed in 1971. The original members of Breakwater consisted of Gene Robinson, James Gee Jones, Lincoln 'Zay' Gilmore, Steve Green, Vince 'Garnel' Dutton, Greg Scott, John 'Dutch' Braddock, and Kae Williams, Jr. They were signed to the Arista label in 1978. Their second album Splashdown, which was released in 1980 has been referred to by Tom Bowker of the Broward Palm Beach New Times as a funk masterpiece.

Releases
In September, 1979, their single "You Know I Love You", written by Greg Scott, and produced by Rick Chertoff was a Billboard top single pick.

For the week ending July 5, 1980, their album Splashdown at its 8th week in the Billboard charts had moved up from 35 to 34. At its 13th week, it was sitting at 57, the position it was the previous week.

Sound
The sound of Breakwater's music is normally that of slow jams, but they have been known to incorporate rock music and funk styles into their songs, much like their song titled "You". "Release the Beast" is best known by non-funk music fans, and the band's sound can be closer compared to that of Con Funk Shun or Earth, Wind & Fire.

Later years
On October 16, 2014, the eleven-piece band with four man horn section played Warmdaddy's on S Columbus Blvd in Philadelphia.
It was announced that the band and fellow seventies act Pockets, an R&B funk band from Baltimore, would appear at London's Brooklyn Bowl on January 7, 2017.

Discography

References

External links

Breakwater at Soulwalking
Breakwater on Facebook

American funk musical groups
American soul musical groups